The Alopekis is a small, foxlike dog from Greece with pricked ears, a sickle-shaped tail, and a smooth short coat.

The dog is found throughout Greece but is most commonly seen in northern Greek regions with a lot of farmland and villages, Serres, Drama, Xanthi etc. The alopekis is believed to be a landrace that descended from a type of small dog common to the Balkan peninsula, although some claim it descends from eastern pye dogs. Alopekis numbers have declined to the point of near extinction in the last half-century, a situation further exacerbated by the mass sterilisation of dogs in some regions to reduce the number of strays, although it still survives in small populations in Northern Greece. Recent efforts have been made to identify surviving populations and save the type.

See also
 Dogs portal
 List of dog breeds

External links

  Alopekis
 Greece’s New Pet Law May Threaten Ancient Greek Dog Breed Alopekis
 Greek Wikipedia entry with many sources about the history of the dog breed

References 

Dog breeds originating in Greece